A.C. Milan finished fifth in the first season under Silvio Berlusconi's ownership. Pietro Paolo Virdis scored 17 goals, becoming top scorer in the entire league. They also qualified for the UEFA Cup, thanks to a victory in a playoff encounter against Sampdoria.

Squad

Transfers

Competitions

Serie A

League table

Results by round

Matches

UEFA Cup qualification

Top scorers
  Pietro Paolo Virdis 17
  Giuseppe Galderisi 3
  Franco Baresi 2
  Mark Hateley 2
  Roberto Donadoni 2
  Daniele Massaro 2

Coppa Italia 

First Round-Group 4

Eightfinals

Statistics

Players statistics

References

Sources
  RSSSF - Italy 1986/87

A.C. Milan seasons
Milan